Pura Dalem Agung Padangtegal, or Padangtegal Great Temple of Death, is one of three Hindu temples making up a temple complex located in the Sacred Monkey Forest Sanctuary – commonly called the "Ubud Monkey Forest" – of Padangtegal, Ubud, Bali, Indonesia.

Also called the "Main Temple," Pura Dalem Agung Padangtegal lies in the southwestern part of the Ubud Monkey Forest grounds and is used for worshiping the god Hyang Widhi in personification of Shiva, the Recycler or Transformer. Like the other two temples in the complex, it is thought to have been built around 1350. The temple complex plays an important role in the spiritual life of the local community.

The area in front of the temple is the home territory of one of the Ubud Monkey Forest's five groups of crab-eating macaques.

Gallery

See also 

 Hinduism in India
 List of Hindu temples in Indonesia

References

External links 

Ubud
Hindu temples in Indonesia
Balinese temples
Buildings and structures in Bali